A referendum on introducing insurance for the elderly and bereaved was held in Liechtenstein on 14 December 1952. The proposal was approved by 53.5% of voters.

Results

References

1952 referendums
1952 in Liechtenstein
Referendums in Liechtenstein
December 1952 events in Europe